Events in the year 1962 in Mexico.

Incumbents

Federal government
 President: Adolfo López Mateos
 Interior Secretary (SEGOB): Gustavo Díaz Ordaz
 Secretary of Foreign Affairs (SRE): Manuel Tello Baurraud
 Communications Secretary (SCT): Walter Cross Buchanan
 Education Secretary (SEP): Jaime Torres Bodet
 Secretary of Defense (SEDENA): Agustín Olachea
 Secretary of Navy: Manuel Zermeño Araico/Antonio Vázquez del Mercado
 Secretary of Labor and Social Welfare: Salomón González Blanco
 Secretary of Welfare: Javier Barros Sierra

Supreme Court

 President of the Supreme Court: Alfonso Guzmán Neyra

Governors

 Aguascalientes
Luis Ortega Douglas (until November 30)
Enrique Olivares Santana (starting December 1)
 Baja California: Eligio Esquivel Méndez
 Campeche: José Ortiz Avila
 Chiapas: Samuel León Brindis
 Chihuahua: Teófilo Borunda/Práxedes Ginér Durán
 Coahuila: Raúl Madero González
 Colima: Francisco Velasco Curiel
 Durango: Francisco González de la Vega/Rafael Hernández Piedras/Enrique Dupré Ceniceros
 Guanajuato: Juan José Torres Landa
 Guerrero: Arturo Martínez Adame
 Hidalgo: Oswaldo Cravioto Cisneros
 Jalisco: Juan Gil Preciado
 State of Mexico: Gustavo Baz 
 Michoacán: David Franco Rodríguez/Agustín Arriaga
 Morelos: Norberto López Avelar
 Nayarit: Francisco García Montero
 Nuevo León: Eduardo Livas Villarreal
 Oaxaca: Alfonso Pérez Gasca/Rodolfo Brena Torres
 Puebla: Arturo Fernández Aguirre
 Querétaro: Manuel González Cosío
 San Luis Potosí: Manuel López Dávila
 Sinaloa: Gabriel Leyva Velásquez
 Sonora: Luis Encinas Johnson
 Tabasco: Carlos A. Madrazo Becerra
 Tamaulipas: Norberto Treviño Zapata	
 Tlaxcala: Joaquín Cisneros Molina
 Veracruz: Antonio María Quirasco/Fernando López Arias
 Yucatán: Agustín Franco Aguilar/José Rodríguez Elías
 Zacatecas: Francisco E. García
Regent of the Federal District: Ernesto P. Uruchurtu

Events

 March 21: Beginning of the 1962 Mexico City radiation accident 
 April 30: Roman Catholic Diocese of Apatzingan established.
 May 23: Rubén Jaramillo is assassinated in Morelos by the Mexican Army.

Awards
Belisario Domínguez Medal of Honor – María Tereza Montoya

Film

  List of Mexican films of 1962

Sport

 1961–62 Mexican Primera División season 
 1962 Mexican Grand Prix 
 Mexico defeats Yugoslavia in the Americas Zone final of the 1962 Davis Cup 
 1962 World Modern Pentathlon Championships are held in Mexico City.

Births
April 24 — Juan Manuel Carreras, Governor of San Luis Potosí starting 2015.
May 7 — Ari Telch, soap opera actor
May 13 — Eduardo Palomo, actor (d. 2003)
May 17 — Arturo Peniche, soap opera actor
May 31 — Victoria Ruffo, soap opera actress
June 24 — Claudia Sheinbaum, scientist and Mayor of Mexico City starting 2018
August 7 – Miroslava Breach, journalist (La Jornada and El Norte de Chihuahua) (d. 2017).
 August 12 – Ariel López Padilla, actor
August 15 — Mario Anguiano Moreno, Governor of Colima 2009-2015
 August 18 – Felipe Calderón, 56th President of Mexico (2006-2012)
August 26 — Omar Fayad, Governor of Hidalgo starting 2016
September 23 — Alberto Estrella, actor
October 23 — Quirino Ordaz Coppel, lawyer and politician (PRI); Governor of Sinaloa 2017–2021

Deaths
 May 23 — Rubén Jaramillo, military and peasant leader in Morelos, assassinated (b. 1900)

References

 
Years in Mexico
Mexico